This is a list of international prime ministerial trips made by Mario Draghi, who served as prime minister of Italy from 13 February 2021 to 22 October 2022.

Trips

2021

2022

Multilateral meetings
Mario Draghi participated in the following summits during his prime ministership:

See also 
 Foreign relations of Italy

References

2021 in international relations
2022 in international relations
Italian prime ministerial visits
Lists of diplomatic trips
Trips
Draghi